Jean-Sébastien Simonoviez (born 1966 in Caen, France), is a French multi-instrumentalist, composer, author and arranger.

Biography

Jean-Sébastien Simonoviez was born to a music-loving father and a hobbyist pianist mother.

From the age of 5, he begins to study classical piano with an “old school” teacher. At 7 years old, he joins a music school in which he is suggested to choose a second instrument (the trumpet). Until the age of 14, he learns and integrates basic music skills, (reading, writing, theory). From 16 years old, he starts playing with other musicians.

In 1989, he records André Jaume's disc "Standards" with Olivier Clerc and François Méchali for the label CELP. Guitarist Pascal Salé, with whom he travels throughout France, teaches him harmony and improvisation techniques.

During the 1990s, he takes part in numerous projects (concerts and recordings, with European musicians such as JP Llabador, Denis Fournier, Fred Monino, JR Dalerci, Joël Allouche, Doudou Gouirand, Philippe Gareil, Maurizio Giammarco, Paolo Fresu... and Americans (Sangoma Everett, Jim Pepper)). He also records with his group Soma « Tacha » (Nil records) dist ZZ. The trio will be on tour for some time with Philippe Petrucciani.

In 1991 he records Transe Lucide with Jean Jacques Avenel and Tony Moreno. Parallel to that, he teaches at the Professional Training Musical Institute of Salon-de-Provence“. In the room where he gives piano lessons a drum kit is permanently set up, he then learns how to play the drums as a self-taught man. He soon plays in groups as a drummer, namely with pianist Perrine Mansuy. On some occasions, he plays with other musicians such as Alain Jean Marie, Michel Grailler, Siegfried Kessler or the English saxophonist Peter King.

From the late 90s, he regularly goes to New York, and shares his time between the United States of America and France.

Back in France, Gérard de Haro offers him to record his first solo piano album Vents et Marées  (Harmonia Mundi, 2003). The disc received a warm welcome from the specialized press. In parallel he joins Gérard Faroux's group in which he'll have the opportunity to meet Misja Fitzgerald Michel, Micky and Ravi Coltrane, Gilles Naturel...

He then creates the group Transition with François Gallix, Gaël Horellou, Yoann Serra and Clara Simonoviez. After a series of concerts, the quintet becomes a septet, integrating arrangements for 2 saxophones, 3 voices, bass, drums, piano. In 2007, he records the project Crossing life and strings  (La Buissonne / Harmonia Mundi) with Jean-Jacques Avenel, Riccardo Del Fra, Barre Phillips, Steve Swallow and the String Quartets Opus 33. In 2008, he's on tour with the Gaël Horellou quartet, with whom he records Pour la terre live at the Sunside with François Gallix and Ari Hoenig. In 2010 he takes part in Maurey Richards’ project  and records The best is yet to come with Philippe Dardelle and Mourad Benhamou.

In 2010, he creates, and co-organizes until 2013, the Fontiers-Cabardès jazz festival.

In 2011, he takes part as pianist and arranger in the project To Frank by Clara Simonoviez with François Gallix, Gaël Horellou and Lolo Bellonzi.

The next year, in 2012, the album Transition Cosmic Power comes out at Black and Blue. In this album, he endorses the roles of author, composer, arranger, singer and pianist.

The album Transe Lucide comes out in February 2013, featuring Jean-Jacques Avenel and Anthony Moreno. Jean-Sébastien Simonoviez is also founder of the label « Hâtive! ».

In 2014 another album « Multifaces » is recorded under the same label.
Since 2015 he spends a fair amount of time in Asia and participates in a number of concerts with Vietnamese musicians.

He also meets Indonesian pianist Nita Aartsen with whom he collaborates as trumpeter and composer.

During this time, the record Transe Lucide is reissued by Indonesian label Demajors.

Discography
 Do Clara Simonoviez (2015)
 Multifaces Jean-Sébastien Simonoviez (2014)
 Transe Lucide Jean-Sébastien Simonoviez (2013)
 Transition Cosmic Power Jean-Sébastien Simonoviez (2012)
 To Frank Clara Simonoviez quintet (2011)
 The best is yet to come Maurey Richards (2010)
 Pour la Terre Gaël Horellou quartet (2009)
 Crossing life and strings Jean-Sébastien Simonoviez (2008)
 Transition Cosmic Power Jean-Sébastien Simonoviez (2006)
 A different way Jean-Sébastien Simonoviez (2005)
 ...Energize ! Simonoviez / d'Oelsnitz (2004)
 Vents et marées Jean-Sébastien Simonoviez (2003)
 Voarshadumia Voarshadumia Quintet (2002)
 The Flood Jean-Sébastien Simonoviez (2002)
 What's new ? Martine Kamoun (2001)
 Existence Jean-Sébastien Simonoviez (1997)
 Autour de la lune Perrine Mansuy (1997)
 Oh when the pandit Philippe Gareil (1995)
 Tacha Trio Soma (1989)
 Belleville Denis Fournier (1989)
 5th edition Jean Pierre Llabador (1989)
 Standards André Jaume Quartet (1987)

References

External links
 Official website

1966 births
Living people
French jazz pianists
French male pianists
French jazz drummers
Male drummers
French jazz trumpeters
Male trumpeters
French music arrangers
20th-century French composers
21st-century French composers
Musicians from Caen
21st-century trumpeters
Date of birth missing (living people)
21st-century pianists
20th-century French male musicians
21st-century French male musicians
French male jazz musicians
Black & Blue Records artists
Harmonia Mundi artists